Wang Jinsong (born 15 November 1968) is a Chinese actor best known for his television roles in Ming Dynasty in 1566  (2007), Nirvana in Fire (2015), Sparrow (2016), The Advisors Alliance (2017) and The Thunder (2019).

Filmography

Film

Television series

Awards and nominations

Variety show

References 

1968 births
Male actors from Jiangsu
Actors from Wuxi
Living people
Chinese male film actors
Chinese male television actors
21st-century Chinese male actors